2021 EuroHockey Nations Championship may refer to:

2021 Women's EuroHockey Nations Championship
2021 Men's EuroHockey Nations Championship